Tryptase gamma, also known as serine protease 31 or transmembrane tryptase, is an enzyme that in humans is encoded by the TPSG1 gene.

Function 

Tryptases comprise a family of trypsin-like serine proteases, the peptidase family S1. Tryptases are enzymatically active only as heparin-stabilized tetramers, and they are resistant to all known endogenous proteinase inhibitors. Several tryptase genes are clustered on chromosome 16p13.3. There is uncertainty regarding the number of genes in this cluster. Currently four functional genes - alpha I, beta I, beta II and gamma I - have been identified. And beta I has an allelic variant named alpha II, beta II has an allelic variant beta III, also gamma I has an allelic variant gamma II. Beta tryptases appear to be the main isoenzymes expressed in mast cells; whereas in basophils, alpha-tryptases predominant. This gene differs from other members of the tryptase gene family in that it has C-terminal hydrophobic domain, which may serve as a membrane anchor. Tryptases have been implicated as mediators in the pathogenesis of asthma and other allergic and inflammatory disorders.

References

Further reading

EC 3.4.21